The 2009 Thüringen Rundfahrt der Frauen was the 22nd edition of the Thüringen Rundfahrt der Frauen, a women's cycling stage race in Germany. It was rated by the UCI as a category 2.1 race and was held between 21 and 26 July 2009.

Stages

Stage 1
21 July 2009 – Altenburg to Altenburg,

Stage 2
22 July 2009 – Gera to Gera,

Stage 3
23 July 2009 – Schleiz to Schleiz,

Stage 4
24 July 2009 – Triebes to Triebes (individual time trial),

Stage 5
25 July 2009 – Schmölln to Schmölln,

Stage 6
26 July 2009 – Greiz to Greiz,

Final classification

Source

See also
 2009 in women's road cycling

References

External links

2009 in women's road cycling
Thüringen Rundfahrt der Frauen
2009 in German sport